Çerkeş District is a district of the Çankırı Province of Turkey. Its seat is the town of Çerkeş. Its area is 947 km2, and its population is 16,746 (2021).

Composition
There are two municipalities in Çerkeş District:
 Çerkeş
 Saçak

There are 49 villages in Çerkeş District:

 Afşar
 Ağaca
 Akbaş
 Akhasan
 Aliözü
 Aydınlar
 Bayındır
 Bedil
 Belkavak
 Beymelik
 Bozoğlu
 Çakmak
 Çalcıören
 Çaylı
 Çördük
 Dağçukurören
 Dikenli
 Dodurga
 Fındıcak
 Gelik Ovacık
 Gökçeler
 Göynükçukuru
 Hacılar
 Halkaoğlu
 Kabakköy
 Kadıköy
 Kadıözü
 Karacahüyük
 Karamustafa
 Karaşar
 Karga
 Kısaç
 Kiremitçi
 Kuzdere
 Kuzören
 Meydanköy
 Örenköy
 Örenli
 Saraycık
 Şeyhdoğan
 Taşanlar
 Turbaşı
 Uluköy
 Yakuplar
 Yeniköy
 Yeşilöz
 Yıprak
 Yoncalı
 Yumaklı

References

Districts of Çankırı Province